Toin Gakuen Schule Deutschland (ドイツ桐蔭学園 Doitsu Tōin Gakuen) was a Japanese international school in Bad Saulgau, Baden-Württemberg, Germany. It opened since many Japanese company employees assigned to work in Germany wanted their children to be prepared for the Japanese school system when they return to Japan. The school had both junior and senior high school sections. Since it was an affiliate of Toin Gakuen (学校法人桐蔭学園), this school was an overseas branch of a Japanese private school, or a Shiritsu zaigai kyoiku shisetsu (私立在外教育施設). The school provided boarding facilities for its students.

In 1994 the school had 136 students, its peak enrollment. The student body declined, with one reason being the Great Recession, despite promotional activities in Europe. As of April 2010 there were 47 students, about one third of the 1994 number, with no 7th grade (first year of junior high school) students. In March 2010 the school announced that it will close by March 2012.

See also
Japanese people in Germany
German international schools in Japan:
German School Tokyo Yokohama - in Yokohama, Japan
Deutsche Schule Kobe/European School

References

External links

 Toin Gakuen Schule Deutschland (dtoin.de)  (Archive) (2003-2012)
 Toin Gakuen Schule (web.infoweb.ne.jp/TOIN-GAKUEN/ger/)  (Archive) (2001-2003)
 "Bad Saulgau: Die letzten japanischen Schüler fahren nach Hause" (Archive). Schwäbische Zeitung. 1 March 2012. Updated 23 December 2013.

Japanese international schools in Germany
Boarding schools in Germany
International schools in Baden-Württemberg
Buildings and structures in Sigmaringen (district)
Bad Saulgau
Educational institutions disestablished in 2012
2012 disestablishments in Germany
Defunct schools in Germany
Defunct shiritsu zaigai kyōiku shisetsu in Europe